Rubén Mesa Visiga (born 16 January 1992) is a Spanish footballer who plays for Extremadura UD as a forward.

Club career
Born in Badajoz, Extremadura, Mesa started playing as a senior with CD Badajoz in the Segunda División B in 2011. On 27 June 2012 he moved to Rayo Vallecano, being assigned to the reserves also in the third level.

On 2 January 2013 Mesa was loaned to fellow league team RSD Alcalá, until June. After returning to Rayo he moved to neighbouring Atlético Madrid B. He scored 11 goals during the campaign, as they narrowly avoided relegation.

On 11 July 2014 Mesa signed a four-year deal with Recreativo de Huelva. On 23 August he made his professional debut, starting in a 0–0 home draw against Real Zaragoza in the Segunda División.

Mesa scored his first goal in the category on 13 December 2014, netting the last in a 2–4 home loss against UD Las Palmas. He left Recre in 2017, and subsequently represented third division sides UD San Sebastián de los Reyes, Villarreal CF B, CF Rayo Majadahonda and Extremadura UD.

References

External links

1992 births
Living people
Sportspeople from Badajoz
Spanish footballers
Footballers from Extremadura
Association football forwards
Segunda División players
Segunda División B players
CD Badajoz players
Rayo Vallecano B players
RSD Alcalá players
Atlético Madrid B players
Recreativo de Huelva players
UD San Sebastián de los Reyes players
Villarreal CF B players
CF Rayo Majadahonda players
Extremadura UD footballers